Ross is an English-language name derived from Gaelic, most commonly used in Scotland. It is also the name of a county in the highland area (Ross and Cromarty). It can be used as a given name, typically for males, but is also a typical family name for people of Scottish descent (Clan Ross). Derived from the Gaelic for a "promontory" or "headland".

The family name can also be of German origin; in German, das Ross (or das Roß) means "the steed" or "the horse".

People with the surname Ross

Names shared by multiple people

Alan Ross (disambiguation)
Alec Ross (disambiguation)
Alexander Ross (disambiguation)
Alex Ross (disambiguation)
Andrew Ross (disambiguation)
Betsy Ross (disambiguation)
Bob Ross (disambiguation)
Charles Ross (disambiguation)
David Ross (disambiguation)
Deborah Ross (disambiguation)
Edward Ross (disambiguation)
Elizabeth Ross (disambiguation)
Frank Ross (disambiguation)
George Ross (disambiguation)
Henry Ross (disambiguation)
Hugh Ross (disambiguation)
Jack Ross (disambiguation)
James Ross (disambiguation)
Jane Ross (disambiguation)
Jerry Ross (disambiguation)
John Ross (disambiguation)
Jonathan Ross (disambiguation)
Josh Ross (disambiguation)
Kenneth Ross (disambiguation)
Lewis Ross (disambiguation)
Malcolm Ross (disambiguation)
Michael Ross (disambiguation)
Richard Ross (disambiguation)
Rick Ross (disambiguation)
Robert Ross (disambiguation)
Ronald Ross (disambiguation)
Ross Campbell (disambiguation)
Ross Lynch (disambiguation)
 Ross Wilson (disambiguation)
Scott Ross (disambiguation)
Stephen Ross (disambiguation)
Steve Ross (disambiguation)
Thomas Ross (disambiguation)
William Ross (disambiguation)

Individual articles
Aaron Ross (born 1982), American football player
Aaron Y. Ross (1829–1922), American old west figure
Adin Ross (born 2000), American Twitch streamer
Adrian Ross, British lyricist
Adrian Ross (American football) (born 1975), American football player
Alex Ross, American comic book writer and artist
Alf Ross, legal philosopher
Andy Ross, American musician
Annie Ross (1930–2020), British-American singer and actress
April Ross (born 1982), American beach volleyball player
Archibald Hilson Ross (1821–1900), New Zealand politician
Arnold Ross (1906–2002), mathematician
Atticus Ross (born 1968), English musician
Ben Ross (born 1980), Australian rugby league footballer
Ben Ross (Australian rules footballer) (born 1988)
Bernard Ross (1924–1999), Welsh footballer
Betsy Ross (1752–1836, American flag maker
Bobby Ross (born 1936), American football player
Bobby Ross (rugby union), (born 1969)
Browning Ross, Olympian and father of long-distance running in US
C. Ben Ross (1876–1946), Governor of Idaho
Carl Ross (1901–1986), British businessman
Caroline Anne Ross, American engineer
Clarence S. Ross (1880–1975), American mineralogist and geologist
Clark Ross (born 1957), Canadian Composer
Cody Ross (born 1980), Major League Baseball outfielder
D'Angelo Ross (born 1996), American football player
D. Bruce Ross (1892–1984), South Australian judge
Dennis Ross (born 1948), American diplomat and author
Dennis A. Ross (born 1959), US congressman from Florida
Diana Ross (born 1944), American singer
Diana Ross (author), English children's book author, illustrator and artist
Earl Ross (1941–2014), Canadian race car driver
Edmund G. Ross (1826–1907), Governor of New Mexico Territory
Elisabeth Kübler-Ross, psychiatrist
Eliza Ann Ross, (1849–1940), commanded the steel four-masted “Reform.”
Fiona Ross (journalist), Scottish journalist and broadcaster
Fiona Ross (nurse) (born 1951), British nurse and academic
"Freeway" Rick Ross (born 1960), convicted drug dealer 
Gabrielle Ross (born 1975), British fashion designer
Gary Ross, US Director
Gaylen Ross, American actress and film director
Glenn Ross, UK strongman/powerlifter
Glenn Ross (politician), Falkland Island politician
Gyasi Ross, Blackfeet author, attorney, rapper, speaker, and storyteller
Henryk Ross (1910–1991), Polish Jewish photographer
Hercules Ross (1745–1816), Scottish merchant who gave evidence against the slave trade
Horatio Ross (1801–1886), sportsman and pioneer photographer
Isaac Ross (1760–1838), an American plantation owner.
Isaac Ross (born 1984), a rugby player from New Zealand.
Ishbel Ross (1895–1975), Scottish-American reporter and nonfiction author
J. K. L. Ross (John Kenneth Leveson Ross, 1876–1951), Canadian thoroughbred racer
Janet Ross (1842–1927), English writer
Jamie Ross, American actor
Jeanne W. Ross, (born c. 1958), American organizational theorist 
Jeffrey Ross, stand-up comedian
Jim Ross, American professional wrestling commentator
Joel Ross, American tennis player
Juana Ross Edwards (1830–1913), Chilean philanthropist
Justin Ross, (born in 1976), Maryland politician
Justyn Ross (born 1999), American football player
Karie Ross (born 1958/9), sports broadcaster
Katharine Ross, actress
Kyla Ross (born 1996), American gymnast 
Landon Timmonds Ross, Jr., environmental biologist
LaQuinton Ross (born 1991), American basketball player for Hapoel Eilat of the Israeli Basketball Premier League
Laura Ross (chess player), chess player
Lawrence Ross (born 1966), American writer
Lawrence Sullivan Ross (a.k.a. Sul Ross) (1838–1898), Governor of Texas
Lee Ross, Canadian-American psychologist
Lee Ross (actor) (born 1971), English professional actor
Lillian Ross (disambiguation), several people
Liz Ross, Australian Marxist, author and gay liberation activist
Liza Ross (born 1941), Canadian actress and voice actress
Ludwig Ross (1806–1859), German classical archaeologist
Luke Ross (born 1972), comic artist
Lyric Ross (born 2003), American actress
Maggie Napaljarri Ross, Indigenous Australian artist
Marie Claire Ross (born 1975 or 1976), Canadian para-swimmer
Marion Ross (born 1928), American actress
Marion Ross (physicist) FRSE (1903–1994), Scottish physicist
Martin Ross, pen name of Violet Florence Martin and Edith Anna Somerville
Marty Ross, Scottish writer
Marty Ross (musician), American musician
Maurice Ross, Scottish footballer
Miles Ross (1827–1903), US Congressman from New Jersey
Nellie Tayloe Ross (1876–1977), Governor of Wyoming
 Nicole Ross (born 1989), American Olympic foil fencer
Ogden J. Ross (1893–1968), New York politician, World War II U.S. army general
Paul Ross, journalist and TV-personality
Percy Ross, philanthropist
Perley Ason Ross (1883–1939), US experimental physicist
Ranger Ross (born 1959), American professional wrestler
Rashad Ross (born 1990), American football player
Richie Ross (born 1982), American football player
Ricky Ross (musician) (born 1957), Scottish musician
Robert Ross (1766–1814), British general
Robbie Ross (1869–1918), friend of Oscar Wilde
Robbie Ross (baseball), (born 1989)
Robbie Ross (rugby league), Australian rugby league footballer
Ronnie Ross (1933–1991), jazz baritone saxophonist
Russell Ross (1929–1999), American pathologist
Ryan Ross, guitarist and lyricist for Panic! at the Disco
Serene Ross (born 1977), American javelin thrower
Share Ross (born 1963), American bass player of the female hard rock band, Vixen
Shavar Ross, actor
Shelley Ross, American television executive producer
Sobieski Ross (1828–1877), US Congressman from Pennsylvania
Sinclair Ross, (1908–1996), Canadian banker
Spencer Ross (born 1940), American sportscaster
Steven Ross (born 1993), Scottish footballer
Summer Ross (born 1992), American beach volleyball player
Tadeusz Ross (1938–2021), Polish actor and politician
Tracee Ellis Ross (born 1972), American actress
Victor Ross (1900–1974), American lacrosse player
Virginia Ross (1857–1923), American author
Wilbur Ross (born 1937), American investor and government official
Wilburn K. Ross (1922–2017) United States Army officer
William Edward Daniel Ross (1912–1995), Canadian actor, playwright and bestselling writer
W. D. Ross (Sir William David Ross, 1877–1971), Scottish philosopher

People with the first name Ross 
Ross Alexander (1907–1937), American stage and film actor
Ross Allen (Irish cricketer) (born 1996), Irish cricketer
Ross Allen (herpetologist) (1908–1981), American herpetologist
Ross Aloisi (born 1973), former Australian footballer
Ross Andru (1927–1993), American comic book artist and editor
Ross Bagdasarian, Sr. (1919–1972), creator of Alvin and the Chipmunks
Ross Bagdasarian, Jr. (born 1949), his son, who continues the Chipmunk media effort
Ross Barkley (born 1993), English footballer
Ross Barnett (1898–1987), U.S. politician
Ross Barnes (1850–1915), one of the stars of baseball's National Association (1871–1875) and the early National League (1876–1881)
Ross Bass (1918–1993), American florist, postmaster, Congressman, and United States Senator from Tennessee
Ross Beever (1946–2010), New Zealand geneticist and mycologist
Ross Bell (1929–2019), American entomologist
Ross Benson (1948–2005), Scottish journalist and gossip columnist
Ross Bentley (born 1956), Canadian racing driver
Ross Blacklock (born 1998), American football player 
Ross Bleckner (born 1949), American artist
Ross Brawn (born 1954), English former motorsport engineer and Formula One team principal
Ross Browner (1954–2022), American football player
Ross Butler (actor) (born 1990), American actor 
Ross Chastain (born 1992), American racing driver
Ross Cheever (born 1964), American racing driver, younger brother of Eddie Cheever
Ross A. Collins (1880–1968), U.S. Representative from Mississippi
Ross Copperman (born 1982), American singer-songwriter
Ross Coyle (born 1937), American football player
Ross Dallow (1937–2020), New Zealand politician
Ross M. Dick (1912–1994), American journalist
Ross Dwelley (born 1995), American football player
Ross Filler, known as Remedy (born 1972), American rapper
Ross Flitney (born 1984), English footballer
Ross Friedman (born 1992), American Major League Soccer player
Ross Gardner (born 1985), English footballer 
Ross Gillespie (1935–2023), New Zealand field hockey player and coach
Ross Hart (born 1960), Canadian-American professional wrestler and promoter
Ross Hornby, Canadian lawyer and diplomat
Ross Hull (born 1975), Canadian actor and meteorologist
Ross Kemp (born 1964), British actor
Ross Krautman (born 1991), American football player
Ross Lynch, (born 1995), American actor, singer and dancer
Ross Macdonald (1915–1983), Canadian mystery writer
Ross MacDonald (born 1965), Canadian sailor
Ross Martin (1920–1981), American actor 
Ross Martin (American football) (born 1993), American football player
Ross Martin (skier) (1943–2011), Australian cross-country skier
Ross Mathews (born 1979), American television personality
Ross Matiscik (born 1996), American football player
 Ross Miner (born 1991), American skating coach and figure skater
Ross Muir (born 1995), English snooker player
Ross Noble (born 1976), English comedian and actor
Ross O'Donovan (born 1987), animator and co-host of the webseries, Steam Train
Ross Parker (1914–1974), English composer
Ross Parker, victim of a racially motivated murder in England shortly after the September 11 attacks
Ross Perot (1930–2019), American businessman and US presidential candidate
Ross Perry (born 1990), Scottish footballer
Ross Pierschbacher (born 1995), American football player
Ross Porter (Canadian broadcaster), Canadian radio executive and music writer
Ross Porter (sportscaster) (born 1938), American sportscaster
Ross Pritchard (1924–2020), American academic administrator
Ross Rawlings, American pianist, composer, conductor, and music director
Ross Rebagliati (born 1971), Canadian snowboarder and Olympic gold medalist
Ross Rowe (born 1977), American Rapper, Podcaster, Producer, Entrepreneur 
Ross Sinclair (artist) (born 1966), Scottish visual artist, musician and writer
Ross Sinclair (water polo) (born 1985), American water polo player and coach
Ross Strudwick, Australian rugby league footballer and coach
Ross Taylor (born 1984), New Zealand cricketer
Ross Taylor (Australian cricketer) (1938–1996), Australian cricketer  
Ross Thomas (born 1981), American actor 
Ross Tucker (born 1979), American football player

Fictional characters 
As a first name
Ross Ewich, a fictional character in the Canadian sketch comedy series You Can't Do That on Television
Ross Geller, character on the TV-series Friends
Ross O'Carroll-Kelly, a literary "dick-lit" character, created by Irish author Paul Howard
Ross Malloy, a character in 1990s American sitcom television series Unhappily Ever After
Ross Poldark, main character of The Poldark Novels, a series of historical novels by Winston Graham
Ross "Bubba" Webster, a character played by Robert Vaughn in the 1983 superhero film Superman III
Ross, a pig who is the main protagonist of Bad Piggies

As a surname
Betty Ross, from Marvel comics, daughter of Thunderbolt Ross
Danny Ross (Law & Order: Criminal Intent), character on the TV-series Law & Order: Criminal Intent
Dr. Doug Ross, character on the TV-series ER
Everett K. Ross, from Marvel comics
Gretchen Ross, character on the feature film Donnie Darko
Jamie Ross (Law & Order), a television character
Leo Ross, a character in the 1989 American action comedy movie Speed Zone
Pete Ross, character who appears in the Superman comic books published by DC Comics
Susan Ross, character on the TV-series Seinfeld
Thunderbolt Ross, from Marvel comics, father of Betty Ross
Emma Ross from Jessie (TV series)
Luke Ross from Jessie (TV series)
Ravi Ross from Jessie (TV series)
Zuri Ross from Jessie (TV series)

See also 
 Ross (disambiguation)
 Cross (surname)
 Clan Ross

References 

German-language surnames
Scottish surnames
Scottish masculine given names
English-language surnames
English masculine given names
Surnames of English origin